Caldwell is an Australian village community in the Deniboota Irrigation Area in the central south part of the Riverina and situated about  west from Deniliquin, New South Wales and  north west from Tantonan.

Caldwell Post Office opened on 21 June 1926 and closed in 1970.

Notes

External links 

 Caldwell Rail Siding

Towns in the Riverina
Murray River Council